Linga is one of the Shetland Islands, in Yell Sound.

Geography and geology
Linga is an extremely common name in Shetland, meaning heather island. This Linga is not far from Firth and Firths Voe, in the West. Fish Holm is to the North and Lunna Ness to the east.

Linga is made of coarse gneiss, with some granite. It is about 43 ha in area and 40m at its highest point.

Footnotes

Uninhabited islands of Shetland